Greenway, also known as Prospect Hill, is a historic home and farm complex located at Madison Mills, Madison County, Virginia. The original section was built about 1780, and is a -story, heavy timber-frame structure, on a hall-and-parlor plan. A shed-roofed rear addition was added shortly before 1800. A rear wing was added in the early-20th century and enlarged in 1986.  Also on the property are the contributing wood frame dairy / maids house; brick dairy / smokehouse; pumphouse (c. 1920); garage, corncrib, and the Madison/Taliaferro family cemetery.  Greenway was built by Francis Madison, brother of President James Madison.

It was listed on the National Register of Historic Places in 1988.

References

Madison family
Houses on the National Register of Historic Places in Virginia
Farms on the National Register of Historic Places in Virginia
Houses completed in 1780
Houses in Madison County, Virginia
National Register of Historic Places in Madison County, Virginia